Carbonaria may refer to:
 Carbonária, an anti-clerical, revolutionary, conspiratorial society, originally established in Portugal in 1822
 Carbonaria (genus), a spider genus in the family Pholcidae
 Silva Carbonaria, the charcoal forest, the dense old-growth forest of beech and oak that formed a natural boundary during the Late Iron Age through Roman times into the Early Middle Ages across what is now Belgium
 Biston betularia f. carbonaria, the black-bodied peppered moth

See also
 Carbonara (disambiguation)
 Carbonari
 Carbonarium
 Carbonarius